Hanneke Eikema (23 March 1925 – 15 April 2012) was a Dutch woman who, during World War II, helped ferry Jewish children to safety and assisted in the financial logistics of the Dutch resistance.

Biography
Eikema, the daughter of a Protestant minister who was himself involved with the resistance, was born in Benningbroek and grew up in Zaandam. She joined the resistance proper in 1944 and, now named "Miep", became the personal courier for Walraven van Hall, leader and banker of the movement, entrusted with carrying large amounts of money and arranging meetings of senior resistance members.

She was interrogated in the prison on the Amstelveenseweg, by Emil Rühl. Van Hall was executed a few weeks later, but Eikema survived the war.

Eikema moved to Sweden, and married Frederick Rappe, a member of the nobility, with whom she emigrated to America. Her husband, a biochemist, got a job at the University of California, Berkeley, and they settled in the San Francisco Bay area, where she worked as an art teacher and ran a Dutch restaurant. Later the family (by then with four children) moved to Montana, and Eikema divorced her Swedish husband and married an American, Les Ippisch. She began a bed and breakfast, and gave lectures and wrote about her war experiences. She also wrote a number of books for children, including Sky: a True Story of Courage during World War II; the title (Sky) was derived from the view of the sky from her prison window on the Amstelveenseweg. She died at age 87 of Alzheimer's disease, in Missoula, Montana.

References

1925 births
2012 deaths
Dutch emigrants to Sweden
Dutch emigrants to the United States
Dutch memoirists
Dutch resistance members
Writers from Missoula, Montana
People from Zaanstad
Neurological disease deaths in Montana
Deaths from Alzheimer's disease